Treacle & Pie is the second EP released by the Welsh rock quartet The Guns. It was  released on 28 June 2010 on iTunes. The EP was recorded at The Lodge studios in South Wales.

Track listing
"Treacle & Pie"
"Colder" (Live)
"No No Know" (Acoustic)
"Sometimes" (Acoustic)

References

2010 EPs
The Guns (band) albums